The Two Foscari: An Historical Tragedy (1821) is a verse play in five acts by Lord Byron. The plot, set in Venice in the mid-15th century, is loosely based on the true story of the downfall of doge Francesco Foscari and his son Jacopo. Byron's play formed the basis of Verdi's opera I due Foscari.

Synopsis
Jacopo Foscari, son of the Doge of Venice, has twice been exiled, once for corruption and once for complicity in the murder of Donato, a member of the Council of Ten. He has been recalled from his second exile to answer the capital charge of treason, and as the play opens he is between sessions of interrogation on the rack. The Council decide to sentence him to a third exile, this time perpetual, rather than to death. His father, doge Francesco Foscari, signs the sentence of exile, though his spirit is broken by this new disgrace. Jacopo's patriotic spirit cannot brook such a sentence, he longs to die, and he duly does die of a broken heart. The Council of Ten orders the doge to abdicate, and, as the bells begin to toll to signify the election of a new doge, the old one falls and dies.

Composition and publication 

Byron wrote The Two Foscari in Ravenna in less than a month, between 12 June and 9 July 1821.  It was published by John Murray on 19 December 1821 in the same volume as his Sardanapalus and Cain. Byron originally intended to dedicate The Two Foscari to his friend Sir Walter Scott, but in the event he transferred that dedication to Cain and left Foscari without one. He added an appendix to The Two Foscari in which he launched a stinging attack on what he considered the hypocrisies of the Poet Laureate, Robert Southey. Southey responded in a letter to a London newspaper in which he dared Byron to attack him again. Byron initially wanted to challenge Southey to a duel, but then turned instead to poetry and wrote his stinging satire The Vision of Judgment.

The Two Foscari in other media
Verdi's opera I due Foscari, with a libretto by Francesco Maria Piave, was based on Byron's play.  It also inspired two paintings, Les deux Foscari by Delacroix, and L'ultimo abboccamento di Jacopo Foscari con la propria famiglia prima di partire per l'esilio cui era stato condannato by Francesco Hayez.

Footnotes

External links
 An edition of The Two Foscari by Peter Cochran

Plays by Lord Byron
1821 plays
Venice in fiction
Plays set in Italy
Plays about families
Plays based on real people
Plays set in the 15th century
Biographical plays about politicians
Tragedy plays
Foscari family